Zorunovac is a village in the municipality of Knjaževac, Serbia. According to the census of 2002, the village had a population of 179 people.

References

Populated places in Zaječar District